Narayanpur is a village in Taraiya block, Saran district of Bihar, India.  the 2011 Census of India, it had a population of 6,253 across 1053 households.

References

Villages in Saran district